This is a list of notable dishes found in Greek cuisine.

Salads, spreads, dips, sauces

Breads

Appetizers and coldcuts

Pitas
Apart from the mainstream Greek pitas, regionally can be found various different versions.

Soups

Egg dishes and pasta

Vegetable dishes

Meat and fish dishes

Desserts and sweets

Cheeses
There is a wide variety of cheeses made in various regions across Greece. The vast majority of them are unknown outside Greece. Many artisanal hand made cheeses, both common varieties and local specialties, are produced by small family farms throughout Greece and offer distinct flavors. A good list of some of the varieties of cheese produced and consumed in Greece can be found in the List of Greek Protected Designations of Origin cheeses article. Here are some of the more popular throughout Greece:

Drinks

References

Lists of foods by nationality
Dishes